Leibo County is a mountainous county of southern Sichuan province, People's Republic of China, along the border with Yunnan. Ayi Jihu, a singer signed to British company Shlepp Records, is from Leibo County.

Geography and climate
Leibo County ranges in latitude from 27° 49' to 28° 36' N and in longitude from 103° 10' to 103° 52' E, and lies on the northern bank of the Jinsha River in the Hengduan Mountains in the eastern portion of Liangshan Prefecture. It borders Yongshan County (Yunnan) to the southeast across the river, the cities of Yibin and Leshan to the north, Meigu County to the west, and Zhaojue and Jinyang counties to the southwest.

Due to its low latitude and elevation above , Leibo has a monsoon-influenced subtropical highland climate bordering on a humid subtropical climate (Köppen Cwb/Cwa), with very warm, rainy summers and cool, damp winters. Rainfall is extremely common year-round, occurring on 207−208 days of the year, but over half of the annual total occurs from June to August. The frost-free period averages 270 days, and there are 1,225 hours of sunshine annually.

References

Liangshan Yi Autonomous Prefecture
Amdo
County-level divisions of Sichuan